Spa Conference may refer to:
 
  
 
   
 Spa Conference of 1920